Nongmensong is a census town in East Khasi Hills district in the Indian state of Meghalaya.

Demographics
 India census, Nongmensong had a population of 11,362. Males constitute 52% of the population and females 48%. Nongmensong has an average literacy rate of 69%, higher than the national average of 59.5%: male literacy is 74%, and female literacy is 64%. In Nongmensong, 15% of the population is under 6 years of age.

Nongmensong formerly known as LALCHAND BASTI, is situated in Shillong (U/A).

Nongmensong is easily accessible from Shillong City main hub via multiple modes of transport like taxis and buses en route to NEIGRIHMS.

Nongmensong is small and beautiful. Except for the scarcity of water, Nongmensong is quite photogenic.

References

East Khasi Hills district
Cities and towns in East Khasi Hills district